Monroe Public Schools can refer to:
Monroe Public Schools (Connecticut), a school district in Monroe, Connecticut
Monroe Public Schools (Michigan), a school district in Monroe, Michigan